The Sporting News College Football Coach of the Year Award is an award that is given annually to NCAA college football's national coach of the year.  The Sporting News (now known as Sporting News) established the award beginning in 1963.

TSN National Coach of the Year 
In the long history of this award, only four coaches have won it twice: Darrell Royal with Texas in 1963 and 1969, Lou Holtz in 1977 with Arkansas and 1988 with Notre Dame, Dennis Erickson in 1992 with Miami and 2000 with Oregon State, and Gary Patterson in 2009 and 2014 with TCU. The only tie for the award came in 2013, with Auburn's Gus Malzahn and Duke's David Cutcliffe sharing honors.

Winners

See also 
Walter Camp Coach of the Year Award
Paul "Bear" Bryant Award
Eddie Robinson Coach of the Year
Woody Hayes Trophy
Associated Press College Football Coach of the Year Award
AFCA Coach of the Year
Home Depot Coach of the Year
Liberty Mutual Coach of the Year Award
George Munger Award
Bobby Dodd Coach of the Year Award

References

College football coach of the year awards in the United States
Awards established in 1963